Los Rey (It All Stays in the Family) is a Mexican telenovela produced by Elisa Salinas for Azteca. It stars Leonardo Garcia, with Michel Brown and Rossana Najera as the protagonists, both dubbed as "La pareja" in the face card, alongside Juan Alfonso Baptista, Ana Belena, Fernando Alonso, Cecilia Ponce, José Alonso, Ofelia Medina, Fernando Luján, Ariel López Padilla, Victor Huggo Martin, and Elizabeth Cervantes. Rafael Gutiérrez and Rodrigo Cachero serve as the directors. Los Rey is written by Luis Felipe Ybarra who is also the associate producer. From 3 September 2012 to 22 February 2013, Azteca 13 broadcast Los Rey, replacing La Mujer de Judas.

Synopsis
Everardo Rey is a powerful businessman who leads the Rey Industrial Group in Mexico. He has three sons: Everardo "Vado", Guillermo and Matías. His wife is Manuela San Vicente.

Behind their image of wealth, there is a story of betrayal and deceit, meticulously planned by Everardo Rey, a man who grew up with Pedro Malvido, his best friend. Both were poor and in their desire to improve their quality of life, they sought the American Dream. In the US, they agree to forget Manuela San Vicente, a high class girl they both loved. Several years later, having made their fortunes, Everardo and Pedro return to Mexico to start a glass collection business. However, Everardo Rey breaks his agreement with Pedro and marries Manuela.

Ruined, Pedro discovers fraud, as well as his friend's betrayal. With his family, Pedro Luis tries to start over again, but he is always waiting for a chance to take revenge on Everardo Rey. Meanwhile, a deep and real love is born between Pedro's daughter Lorenza Malvido and Matías Rey, who try to ease the hatred between their families in order to be happy together in peace.

Casting
Garcia, Brown and Baptista were the first to be cast in this adaptation. In this telenovela, Leonardo Garcia takes on his first villain role ever in his career, while Nájera debuts as a main protagonist and it also marks the return of Ofelia Medina to the small screen. Edgar Castillo Sosa was appointed as the casting director for the telenovela.

Fernando Lujan and Pepe Alonso reunites again as enemies for the third time in this series.

Jonathan Islas was offered the role of Leonardo in the novela but he declined the offer and joins Telemundo's El Rostro de la Venganza instead.

The telenovela later features Sergio Basañez as Ronco Abadi, a hidden character, which is his first villain role for Azteca.

Characters

Filming
The filming of promotional clips and opening montage started on 30 June The filming started on 30 July. In the end, the original opening montage was not used and is replaced by random scenes of the novela. Instead, it was used as the bumpers during commercials. The filming ended on 22 December 2012.

Las Vegas
On 8 September, cast members Karen Senties, Ariel Lopez Padilla and Leonardo Garcia flew to Las Vegas to film flashback scenes back to 20 years ago.

Theme songs

"Los Rey"
Also known as "El imperio de los Rey" in La Academia 10
Opening theme
Sung by Los Tigrillos

"Algo entre los dos"
Original version by Edgar Azcuy
Lorenza and Matias' love theme
Solo version sung by Rykardo Hernandez.
Tamara and Gervasio's theme
Duet version sung by Cynthia and Raul Sandoval.

Other featured songs
Amado and Fina's themes
"Lloran las rosas" a cover version of Christian Castro's original song.
"Amores prohibidos" by Elefante.

Public relations

Autograph session

References

2012 telenovelas
2012 Mexican television series debuts
2013 Mexican television series endings
Mexican telenovelas
TV Azteca telenovelas
Spanish-language telenovelas